Two ships of the United States Navy have been named Bunker Hill, in remembrance of the Battle of Bunker Hill during the American Revolutionary War:
 , was an Essex-class aircraft carrier that fought heavily in the Pacific during World War II
 , is a guided missile cruiser commissioned in 1986

Merchant vessels
 SS Bunker Hill, a civilian-operated T2 tanker steamer, sank on 6 March 1964 after an explosion. She broke in two near Anacortes, Washington.

References

United States Navy ship names